Marie-Gaïané Mikaelian (born 3 March 1984) is a former tennis player from Switzerland. She turned professional in 2001 and won one career singles title.

Her father is Armenian.

WTA career finals

Singles: 4 (1 title, 3 runner-ups)

ITF Circuit finals

Singles (1–2)

References

External links
 
 
 

1984 births
Living people
Sportspeople from Lausanne
Swiss female tennis players
Armenian female tennis players
Swiss people of Armenian descent